Accelerated Learning Laboratory is a free public Charter school (a member campus of Accelerated Elementary and Secondary Schools) in Tucson, Arizona, United States. It provides educational services for elementary, middle, and high school students (Pre-K..12). The school is located near the base of Wasson Peak in the foothills of the Tucson Mountains.

In 2017, The Washington Post ranked the school the twenty sixth most challenging high school in the United States.

References

Schools in Tucson, Arizona